Artsyom Vaskow (born 21 October 1988) is a Belarusian professional footballer who plays as a midfielder for Polish III liga club Stilon Gorzów Wielkopolski.

Honours
Torpedo-BelAZ Zhodino
Belarusian Cup: 2015–16

Ventspils
Latvian Football Cup: 2016–17

Gomel
Belarusian Cup: 2021–22

References

External links 

1988 births
Living people
Sportspeople from Gomel
Belarusian footballers
Association football midfielders
FC Gomel players
FC Dinamo Minsk players
SK Blāzma players
FC Neman Grodno players
AZAL PFK players
FC DSK Gomel players
FC Vitebsk players
FC Torpedo-BelAZ Zhodino players
FK Ventspils players
FC Smolevichi players
FC Gorodeya players
FC Arsenal Dzerzhinsk players
KS Lublinianka players
Stilon Gorzów Wielkopolski players
Belarusian Premier League players
Belarusian First League players
Azerbaijan Premier League players
Latvian Higher League players
III liga players
Belarusian expatriate footballers
Expatriate footballers in Azerbaijan
Expatriate footballers in Latvia
Expatriate footballers in Poland
Belarusian expatriate sportspeople in Azerbaijan
Belarusian expatriate sportspeople in Latvia
Belarusian expatriate sportspeople in Poland